Mazhar ul Islam, meaning "light of Islam", may refer to:

 Muzharul Islam (1923–2012), Bangladeshi architect
 Mazharul Islam (poet) (1929–2003), Bangladeshi poet and academic
 Mazhar ul Islam (born 1949), Pakistani short story writer and novelist
 Mazhar-ul-Islam (1950s–1978), Bangladeshi cricketer
 Mazharul Islam Himel (born 1988), Bangladeshi footballer